The paramo pipit (Anthus bogotensis) is a species of bird in the family Motacillidae. It is found in Argentina, Bolivia, Colombia, Ecuador, Peru, and Venezuela. Its natural habitats are subtropical or tropical high-altitude grassland and pastureland.

Gallery

References

paramo pipit
Birds of the Northern Andes
Páramo fauna
paramo pipit
paramo pipit
Taxonomy articles created by Polbot